The White Ecstasy (German: Der weiße Rausch) is a 1931 German mountain film written and directed by Arnold Fanck and starring Hannes Schneider, Leni Riefenstahl, Guzzi Lantschner, and Walter Riml. The film is about the skiing exploits of a young village girl (played by Riefenstahl), and her attempts to master the sport of skiing and ski-jumping aided by the local ski expert (played by Schneider). Filmed on location in Sankt Anton am Arlberg, the film was one of the first to use and develop outdoor film-making techniques and featured several innovative action-skiing scenes.

Two Tyrolean skiing stars, Walter Riml and Guzzi Lantschner, have important parts in this movie. They play two Hamburger carpenters in their traditional outfits. They come to the Arlberg and try to learn how to ski with the aid of two different skiing books. A Weisse Rausch downhill race, based on the film, is held every April in St. Anton.

Cast
 Hannes Schneider as Hannes
 Leni Riefenstahl as Leni
 Rudi Matt as Rudi
 Lothar Ebersberg as Der kleine Lothar
 Guzzi Lantschner as Guzzi, the Hamburger carpenter
 Walter Riml as Walter, the Hamburger carpenter 
 Otto Lantschner
 Harald Reinl
 David Zogg
 Josef Gumboldt
 Hans Kogler
 Luggi Foeger
 Benno Leubner
 Hans Salcher
 Kurt Reinl

References
Notes

Bibliography

 Filmwelt Nr. 51 (20 December 1931) Berlin
 Sadoul, Georges; Morris, Peter (1972). Dictionary of Film Makers University of California Press  pg 79
 Hinton, David B. (2000) The Films of Leni Riefenstahl Scarecrow Press  pg 9-10
 Richards, Jeffrey (2013) Visions of Yesterday  pg 294

External links
 
 
 
 Walter Riml website

1931 films
German black-and-white films
1930s German-language films
Films of the Weimar Republic
Mountaineering films
Skiing films
Films directed by Arnold Fanck
Films set in the Alps
Films scored by Paul Dessau
German comedy films
1931 comedy films
1930s German films